Irene Neal is an internationally exhibited American painter. She graduated from Wilson College in Chambersburg, Pennsylvania in 1958.
She was a member of the New New Painters a group of artists brought together by the first curator of modern and contemporary art at the Boston Museum of Fine Arts, Dr. Kenworth Moffett (1934 - 2016) in 1978, contemporaneously with the further development of acrylic gel paint as developed by the paint chemist Sam Golden. In describing her work the Moffett stated "Irene Neal works in the tradition of large size, free form abstraction, originating with Jackson Pollock, the Abstract Expressionists, and the Color Field Painters".

References

External links
 The artist's website - 

Living people
American artists
Year of birth missing (living people)